Isodictya is a genus of marine demosponge in the family Isodictyidae.

Species
Species in the genus include:
 Isodictya alata (Stephens, 1915)
 Isodictya aspera Bowerbank, 1877
 Isodictya bentarti Rios, Cristobo & Urgorri, 2004
 Isodictya cavicornuta Dendy, 1924
 Isodictya chichatouzae Uriz, 1984
 Isodictya compressa (Esper, 1794)
 Isodictya conulosa (Ridley & Dendy, 1886)
 Isodictya cutisanserina Goodwin, Jones, Neely & Brickle, 2016
 Isodictya deichmannae (de Laubenfels, 1949)
 Isodictya delicata (Thiele, 1905)
 Isodictya doryphora (Brøndsted, 1927)
 Isodictya dufresni Boury-Esnault & van Beveren, 1982
 Isodictya echinata Thomas & Matthew, 1986
 Isodictya ectofibrosa (Lévi, 1963)
 Isodictya elastica (Vosmaer, 1880)
 Isodictya erinacea (Topsent, 1916)
 Isodictya foliata (Carter, 1885)
 Isodictya frondosa (Lévi, 1963)
 Isodictya frondosa (Pallas, 1766)
 Isodictya grandis (Ridley & Dendy, 1886)
 Isodictya histodermella de Laubenfels, 1942
 Isodictya kerguelenensis (Ridley & Dendy, 1886)
 Isodictya lankesteri (Kirkpatrick, 1907)
 Isodictya lenta (Vosmaer, 1880)
 Isodictya microchela (Topsent, 1915)
 Isodictya multiformis (Stephens, 1915)
 Isodictya obliquidens (Hentschel, 1914)
 Isodictya palmata (Ellis & Solander, 1786)
 Isodictya porifera (Whitelegge, 1906)
 Isodictya pulviliformis (Koltun, 1955)
 Isodictya quatsinoensis (Lambe, 1893)
 Isodictya rigida (Lambe, 1893)
 Isodictya setifera (Topsent, 1901)
 Isodictya spinigera (Kirkpatrick, 1907)
 Isodictya staurophora (Hentschel, 1911)
 Isodictya toxophila Burton, 1932
 Isodictya trigona (Topsent, 1917)
 Isodictya vancouverensis (Lambe, 1893)
 Isodictya verrucosa (Topsent, 1913)

References

Poecilosclerida